Kristján Mímir Kristjánsson (born 17 August 1986) is a Norwegian politician representing the Red Party. He is currently a member of the Storting for Rogaland since 2021. He was formerly a city councilor in Stavanger and a political journalist for Klassekampen.

Personal life 
He hails from Stavanger and has an Icelandic father and a Norwegian mother.

He was in a relationship with Mathilde Holdhus, with whom he has two children. In 2022, he revealed that they had separated the year before shortly after their second child was born.

In August 2022, he confirmed that he was in a relationship with fellow Red Party MP Sofie Marhaug.

Career

Red Youth
He served as the leader of Norway's Red Youth between April 2006 and June 2008, and the secretary of the Red Party's election campaign from June 2008 until the 2009 Norwegian parliamentary election.

Local politics
He was elected to the Stavanger city council in the 2019 local election, and also became the leader for the City Committee for Labour and Salary.

Parliament
Kristjánsson was elected to the Storting in the 2021 election. 

In March 2022, he stated that it was the right thing to do for Minister of Labour Hadia Tajik to resign.

Bibliography
In October 2011, he published a book titled De superrike (The Super Rich).

References 

1986 births
Living people
Norwegian people of Icelandic descent
Politicians from Stavanger
Red Party (Norway) politicians
Norwegian journalists